In fluid dynamics, the Davey–Stewartson equation (DSE) was introduced in a paper by  to describe the evolution of a three-dimensional wave-packet on water of finite depth.

It is a system of partial differential equations for a complex (wave-amplitude) field  and a real (mean-flow) field :

The DSE is an example of a soliton equation in 2+1 dimensions.

In 1+1 dimensions the DSE reduces to the nonlinear Schrödinger equation

Itself, the DSE is the particular reduction of the Zakharov–Schulman system.  On the other hand, the equivalent counterpart of the DSE is the Ishimori equation.

The DSE is the result of a multiple-scale analysis of modulated nonlinear surface gravity waves, propagating over a horizontal sea bed.

See also

 Nonlinear systems
 Ishimori equation

References

External links
Davey-Stewartson_system at the dispersive equations wiki.

Partial differential equations
Integrable systems
Equations of fluid dynamics